The Privacy Commissioner for Bermuda is an independent public office of Bermuda with a mandate "to regulate the use of personal information by organisations in a manner which recognizes both the need to protect the rights of individuals in relation to their personal information and the need for organisations to use personal information for legitimate purposes, among other duties."

The office was created by the Personal Information Protection Act 2016 and oversees any individual, entity or public authority that uses personal information.

The Privacy Commissioner has the authority to conduct investigations concerning compliance, make orders, educate the public and engage in research, give guidance, and "do anything which reasonably appears to him [sic] to be incidental or conducive to the carrying out of his [sic] functions under this Act."

The current Commissioner is Alexander McD White, who was appointed on January 20, 2020 by the Governor of Bermuda.

Privacy Commissioners 
There has been one Privacy Commissioner since the office was established.

See also 

 Information Commissioner's Office for Bermuda
 Government of Bermuda privacy page

External links 

 Official website
 Official Account of Privacy Commissioner on LinkedIn
 Official Account of Privacy Commissioner on Twitter
 Personal Information Protection Act 2016

References 

Politics of Bermuda
United Kingdom privacy law